Grbavica is a quarter of the city of Sarajevo, Bosnia and Herzegovina. Today it is part of the municipality of Novo Sarajevo and administratively distinguished between Grbavica I and Grbavica II.

The area was developed as a new residential neighbourhood by the authorities of Socialist Yugoslavia, on the west back of the Miljacka river.
Grbavica I, between Zagrebacka ulica and the Miljacka river, besides residential building hosts the Forestry Faculty of the University of Sarajevo (Šumarski Fakultet), the Kovačići Franciscan monastery (Franjevački samostan), the Jordanian Mosque (Jordanska Džamija, 1996), three primary schools (OS Kovačići, OS Grbavica I and OS Grbavica II) and the Netherlands embassy.
On its north-west corner the new British embassy to Bosnia and Herzegovina has been built.
Grbavica II, between Grbavica I and Hrasno, hosts the Grbavica shopping centre and the Ummu Arif Zabadne mosque. South of Zagrebacka ulica are the Grbavica Stadium, home of FK Željezničar, and the Catholic Church of St. Ignatius (Crkva Sv.Ignacija Lojolskog).

Gallery

References

External links

Neighbourhoods in Grad Sarajevo
Novo Sarajevo
Populated places in the Sarajevo Canton